Palma Ceia West is a neighborhood within the city limits of Tampa, Florida, located just west of Palma Ceia. As of the 2000 census the neighborhood had a population of 2,531. The ZIP Codes serving the neighborhood are 33609 and 33629. The neighborhood is part of the South Tampa District.

Geography
Palma Ceia West boundaries are San Obispo to the south, Morrison Avenue to the north, Dale Mabry Highway to the east and Lois Avenue to the west.

Demographics
Source: Hillsborough County Atlas

As of the census of 2000, there were 2,531 people and 1,127 households residing in the neighborhood. The population density was 3,929/mi2. The racial makeup of the neighborhood was 96% White, 1% African American, 0% Native American, less than 1% Asian or Pacific Islander, less than 1% from other races, and 2% from two or more races. Hispanic or Latino of any race were 8% of the population.

There were 1,127 households, out of which 32% had children under the age of 18 living with them, 50% were married couples living together, 10% had a female householder with no husband present, and 7% were non-families. 32% of all households were made up of individuals.

In the neighborhood the population was spread out, with 24% under the age of 18, 19% from 18 to 34, 29% from 35 to 49, 16% from 50 to 64, and 13% who were 65 years of age or older. For every 100 females, there were 93.1 males.

The per capita income for the neighborhood was $34,830. About 2% of the population were below the poverty line, 10% of those were under the age of 18.

See also
Neighborhoods in Tampa, Florida

References

External links
Palma Ceia West Neighborhood Association 
Palma Ceia West information from Neighborhood Link

Neighborhoods in Tampa, Florida